The following is a list of notable events and releases of the year 2000 in Norwegian music.

Events

January
 28 – The 3rd Polarjazz started in Longyearbyen, Svalbard (February 28–30).

February
 2 – The annual by:Larm started in Trondheim, Norway (March 2– ).

March
 |16 – The Oslo Kirkemusikkfestival started in Oslo, Norway (March 16–25).

April
 14 – The 27th Vossajazz started in Voss, Norway (April 14–16).
 26 –  Ole Blues started in Bergen (April 26 – May 1).

May
 10 – The 11th MaiJazz started in Stavanger, Norway (May 10–14).
 24 – The start of Bergen International Music Festival Festspillene i Bergen (May 24 – June 4).
 25 – The 28th Nattjazz started in Bergen, Norway (May 25 – June 3).

June
 10 – The Norwegian Wood started in Oslo, Norway (June 10–12).
 17 – The 2nd Øyafestivalen started at Kalvøya near by Oslo (June 17–18).

July
 5 – The 37th Kongsberg Jazzfestival started in Kongsberg, Norway (July 5–8).
 17 – The 40th Moldejazz started in Molde, Norway (July 17–22).

August
 9 – The 14th Sildajazz started in Haugesund, Norway (August 9–13).
 11 – The 15th Oslo Jazzfestival started in Oslo, Norway (August 11–19).
 18 – The Bergen International Chamber Music Festival started in Bergen, Norway (August 18–27).

September
 5 – The Trondheim Kammermusikk Festival started in Trondheim, Norway (September 5–10).

Oktober
 6 – The Ultima Oslo Contemporary Music Festival started in Oslo, Norway (October 6–15).
 12 – The DølaJazz started in Lillehammer, Norway (October 12–15).

November
 2 – The Trondheim Jazz Festival started in Trondheim, Norway (November 2–5).

December

Albums released

Unknown date

J
 Tore Johansen
 Man, Woman And Child (Gemini Records), featuring Karin Krog

R
 Terje Rypdal
 Double Concerto / 5th Symphony (ECM Records)

Deaths

January
 29 – Beate Asserson, mezzo-soprano opera singer (born 1913).

February
 12 – Reidar Andresen, popular singer and composer (born 1917).

March
 6 – Ole Jacob Hansen, jazz drummer (born 1940).
 18 – Randi Hultin, jazz critic and impresario (born 1926).

April
 2 – Greta Gynt, singer, dancer and actress (born 1916).

June
 22 – Svein Finnerud, jazz pianist, painter, and graphic artist (born 1945).

October
 17 – Joachim «Jokke» Nielsen, rock musician and poet (born 1964).

See also
 2000 in Norway
 Music of Norway
 Norway in the Eurovision Song Contest 2000
 2000 in jazz

References

 
Norwegian music
Norwegian
Music
2000s in Norwegian music